Promno  is a village in the administrative district of Gmina Pobiedziska, within Poznań County, Greater Poland Voivodeship, in west-central Poland.

The village gives its name to the protected area of Promno Landscape Park.

References

Promno